Ludwig Wenz (24 August 1906 – 18 April 1968) was a German international footballer.

References

1906 births
1968 deaths
Association football goalkeepers
German footballers
Germany international footballers